The double acute accent ( ˝ ) is a diacritic mark of the Latin and Cyrillic scripts. It is used primarily in Hungarian or Chuvash, and consequently it is sometimes referred to by typographers as hungarumlaut. The signs formed with a regular umlaut are letters in their own right in the Hungarian alphabet—for instance, they are separate letters for the purpose of collation. Letters with the double acute, however, are considered variants of their equivalents with the umlaut, being thought of as having both an umlaut and an acute accent.

Uses

Vowel length

History
Length marks first appeared in Hungarian orthography in the 15th-century Hussite Bible. Initially, only á and é were marked, since they are different in quality as well as length. Later í, ó, ú were marked as well.

In the 18th century, before Hungarian orthography became fixed, u and o with umlaut + acute (ǘ, ö́) were used in some printed documents. 19th century typographers introduced the double acute as a more aesthetic solution.

Hungarian
In Hungarian, the double acute is thought of as the letter having both an umlaut and an acute accent. Standard Hungarian has 14 vowels in a symmetrical system: seven short vowels (a, e, i, o, ö, u, ü) and seven long ones, which are written with an acute accent in the case of á, é, í, ó, ú, and with the double acute in the case of ő, ű. Vowel length has phonemic significance in Hungarian, that is, it distinguishes different words and grammatical forms.

Slovak
At the beginning of the 20th century, the letter A̋ (A with double acute) was used in Slovak as a long variant of the short vowel Ä (A with diaeresis), representing the vowel  in dialect and some loanwords. The letter is still used for this purpose in Slovak phonetic transcription systems.

Umlaut

Handwriting
In handwriting in German and Swedish, the umlaut is sometimes written similarly to a double acute. In the Swedish alphabet, Å, Ä and Ö are letters in their own right.

Chuvash
The Chuvash language written in the Cyrillic script uses a double-acute Ӳ, ӳ  as a front counterpart of Cyrillic letter У, у  (see Chuvash vowel harmony), likely after the analogy of handwriting in Latin script languages. In other minority languages of Russia (Khakas, Mari, Altai, and Khanty), the umlauted form Ӱ is used instead.

Faroese

Classical Danish handwriting uses "ó" for "ø", which becomes a problem when writing Faroese in the same tradition, as "ó" is a part of the Faroese alphabet. Thus ő is sometimes used for ø in Faroese.

Tone

International Phonetic Alphabet
The IPA and many other phonetic alphabets use two systems to indicate tone: a diacritic system and an adscript system. In the diacritic system, the double acute represents an extra high tone.

One may encounter this use as a tone sign in some IPA-derived orthographies of minority languages, such as in the North American Native Tanacross (Athapascan). In line with the IPA usage it denotes the extra-high tone.

Letters with double acute

Technical notes

O and U with double acute accents are supported in the Code page 852, ISO 8859-2, and Unicode character sets.

Code page 852
Some of the box-drawing characters of the original DOS code page 437 were sacrificed in order to put in more accented letters (all printable characters from ISO 8859-2 are included).

ISO 8859-2
In ISO 8859-2, the characters Ő, ő, Ű, and ű take the place of some similar-looking (but distinct, especially at bigger font sizes) letters of ISO 8859-1.

Unicode
All occurrences of "double acute" in character names in the Unicode 9.0 standard:

LaTeX Input
In LaTeX, the double acute accent is typeset with the \H{} (mnemonic for "Hungarian") command. For example, the name Paul Erdős (in his native Hungarian: Erdős Pál) would be typeset as

Erd\H{o}s P\'al.

X11 Input

See also
 Acute accent
 Double grave accent
 Umlaut/Diaeresis
 Hungarian alphabet

Footnotes

External links

 Diacritics Project—All you need to design a font with correct accents (contains some incorrect/sloppy data on history)

Latin-script diacritics
Cyrillic-script diacritics
Hungarian language